Huber is an unincorporated community in Twiggs County, in the U.S. state of Georgia.

History
Variant names were "Philip" and "Philip Station". The present name is after J.M. Huber, proprietor of the local J.M. Huber Company.

References

Unincorporated communities in Twiggs County, Georgia
Unincorporated communities in Georgia (U.S. state)